Gaëlle d'Ynglemare, sometimes credited as Gaël d'Ynglemare, is a Canadian film director and screenwriter from Quebec. She is most noted for her 2004 short film Capacité 11 personnes, which won the Genie Award for Best Live Action Short Drama at the 21st Genie Awards.

Her first short film, Pas de deux sur chanson triste (1998), was a Jutra Award nominee for Best Live Action Short Film at the 1st Jutra Awards in 1999. She subsequently directed the short film No Vacancy (2006) and the documentary film MixMania, Le réveil (2006) before releasing her debut feature film Le Colis in 2011.

She followed up in 2021 with Livrés chez vous sans contact, a sketch comedy film starring the duo of Jean-Marie Corbeil and François Maranda. She is married to Jean-Marie Corbeil.

References

External links

21st-century Canadian screenwriters
21st-century Canadian women writers
Canadian women screenwriters
Canadian women film directors
Canadian documentary film directors
Canadian screenwriters in French
French Quebecers
Film directors from Quebec
Writers from Quebec
Directors of Genie and Canadian Screen Award winners for Best Live Action Short Drama
Living people
Year of birth missing (living people)
Canadian women documentary filmmakers